NORCECA Volleyball Championship may refer to
 NORCECA Men's Volleyball Championship
 NORCECA Women's Volleyball Championship